Scott McConnell (born 1952) is an American journalist best known as a founding editor of The American Conservative.

Early life
McConnell was born in 1952. He is the great grandson of  businessman David H. McConnell, the founder of  Avon and stepson of actor Sterling Hayden. He was educated at Phillips Exeter Academy. He earned a bachelor's degree in 1975 and, after working on the 1976 presidential campaign of Jimmy Carter, a Ph.D. in history in 1987, all from Columbia University.

Career
McConnell began writing for publications such as Commentary and National Review. In 1989,  McConnell became an editorial writer and later columnist for the New York Post and served as editorial page editor in 1997. He was a columnist for Antiwar.com until 2002. He co-founded The American Conservative with Pat Buchanan and Taki Theodoracopolous in 2002. At the end of 2004, McConnell became the sole editor of TAC.

McConnell is the author of several books. In Leftward Journey: The Education of Vietnamese Students in France, 1919–1939, he argues that French paternalistic attitudes led to the rejection of liberalism by Vietnamese students, whose nationalism subsequently radicalized along Marxism lines.

References

1952 births
Living people
20th-century American journalists
20th-century American male writers
20th-century American non-fiction writers
21st-century American journalists
21st-century American male writers
21st-century American non-fiction writers
American columnists
American foreign policy writers
American male non-fiction writers
American male journalists
American political journalists
American political writers
New York Post people
American opinion journalists
Phillips Exeter Academy alumni
Place of birth missing (living people)
Columbia College (New York) alumni
Columbia Graduate School of Arts and Sciences alumni